Melissa Perry is an American epidemiologist and microbiologist, who served as chair of the Department of Environmental and Occupational Health at George Washington University between 2011 and 2022., Perry was chair of the Board of Scientific Counselors for the National Center for Environmental Health/Agency for Toxic Substances and Disease Registry (NCEH/ATSDR) of the Centers for Disease Control and Prevention between 2015 and 2019.

Education and early life 

Perry was born in Pittsfield Massachusetts in 1966 and grew up in Northern Vermont. She received a bachelor's degree in psychology at the University of Vermont, and masters and doctoral degrees from Johns Hopkins University School of Hygiene and Public Health. At George Washington University, Perry directs a laboratory and teaches graduate students.

Research work 

Perry spent 13 years as faculty with the department of environmental health at the Harvard School of Public Health. Her work at Harvard included conducting occupational health research on the causes of injuries in meatpacking plants, which later became important for understanding the inordinate risks faced by US meatpacking workers during the COVID-19 pandemic. In 2011, Perry was appointed chair of the Department of Environmental and Occupational Health at George Washington University.

At George Washington, Perry currently directs a lab that investigates the impact of various environmental exposures on human health, focusing on reproductive toxicity caused by pesticide exposures. Perry's lab has also developed new techniques for high-volume identification of chromosomal abnormalities in sperm cells. The lab has conducted multiple studies to understand the link between chromosomal abnormalities caused by environmental risk factors. In 2015, the lab was involved in conducting the first large scale epidemiological study to look at organophosphate poisoning and chromosomal abnormalities in adult men. 

Research from the lab provided extensive evidence showing automated methods are superior to manual methods for estimating sex chromosome disomy through fluorescence in situ hybridization (FISH) techniques. The lab also published the largest study to date to provide estimates of sex chromosome disomy among men attending fertility clinics. Most recently, lab members have investigated exposure to commonly used herbicides in the United States, including 2,4-D and glyphosate, and have investigated environmental and reproductive health among men of color in Washington, D.C.

Honors and awards 

Perry is currently co-chair of the National Academies of Sciences, Engineering, and Medicine Committee on Emerging Science and chair of the review committee of the Health Effects Institute. She is past president of the American College of Epidemiology (2014–15) and is a fellow of the Collegium Ramazzini,.

Perry was chosen to participate in the Hedwig van Ameringen Executive Leadership in Academic Medicine (ELAM) Fellowship. The ELAM program is dedicated to preparing women for senior leadership roles in schools of medicine, dentistry, public health and pharmacy.  She is also a 2021 recipient of the Fulbright Scholar Fellowship to Albania to conduct research and lecture in public health capacity building.

References

External links 

 

1966 births
Living people
George Washington University faculty
University of Vermont alumni
Johns Hopkins Bloomberg School of Public Health alumni
American women epidemiologists
American epidemiologists
American microbiologists
People from Pittsfield, Massachusetts